Did You Fall in Love Along the Beautiful Rhine? is a 1927 German silent romance film directed by James Bauer and starring Philipp Manning, Oskar Marion, and Dorothea Wieck.

It was made at the Emelka Studios in Munich. The film's sets were designed by the art director Ludwig Reiber.

Cast

References

Bibliography

External links

1927 films
Films of the Weimar Republic
Films directed by James Bauer
German silent feature films
Bavaria Film films
Films shot at Bavaria Studios
German black-and-white films
German romance films
1920s romance films
1920s German films